Piledriver is a Canadian thrash/speed metal band, formed in 1984 by Gord Kirchin. They are known for an over-the-top image and flamboyant song titles and lyrics (as exemplified by such tracks as "Sex with Satan", "Alien Rape", "Sodomize the Dead", "Witch Hunt" and "Human Sacrifice"). Their best known song is possibly the title track of their debut album, Metal Inquisition from 1984. The album was followed by Stay Ugly two years later in 1986. These two early recordings have globally sold nearly 500,000 copies to date.

The band soon disappeared. However, some years later, Kirchin revealed that the band and albums were just a studio project and that the band never really existed at all, with all the names and virtually everything else about the band being made up. Kirchin later formed his own band, Dogs with Jobs, sporadically working on solo material. 

In 2005, a new band was formed under the revised name of The Exalted Piledriver. A long search began for Kirchin to find the right musicians to fill the promise of the original albums. In the summer of 2006 the line-up was finalized: Mark Kopernicky (stage name Kinky Pork Cream, guitars), Gerry Keough (stage name Glace Frothfritter, drums) and Robert Tollefson (stage name Lobo Elf Snort, bass). After many live shows in Canada, the US and in Europe, the band entered the studio in late 2007 to record the first album to feature an actual band. The album, entitled Metal Manifesto, was released in 2008. The band will be playing shows in Canada and Europe during 2009, including a date at the Headbanger's Open Air festival in Itzehoe, Germany in July.

The band was reassembled with new supporting members in 2009.

 Gord Kirchin (aka 'Pile Driver', vocals)
 Steve Macpherson (aka 'Reverend Tom Cheapness', guitar)
 Ken Gibson (aka 'Steele McFearsome', bass)
 Mark Macpherson (aka 'Hank Momscraper', drums)

This line-up has toured Brazil (fall 2017) and Columbia (2018), and played festivals such as Calgary MetalFest V (2016), Amsterdam Heavy Metal Maniacs (2018) and Storm Crusher Festival (2019), and headlined shows in Toronto, Ottawa, Montreal and Quebec City.

Kirchin died from lung cancer at age 60 on 22 September 2022.

Discography

As Piledriver 
 Metal Inquisition (LP, 1984)
 Stay Ugly (LP, 1986)

As The Exalted Piledriver 
 Official Live Bootleg Shpinsk, Batslavia (DVD, 2005)
 Metal Manifesto / Promo '05 (Demo, 2005)
 Metal Manifesto (LP, 2008)
 Night of the Unpolished Turd (Live LP, 2011)

References

External links 
 The Exalted Piledriver on Facebook
 Exalted Piledriver biography @ Metal Underground
 Exalted Piledriver and Piledriver historical interview @ Metallian

Canadian thrash metal musical groups
Musical groups established in 1984
Musical groups from Toronto
1984 establishments in Ontario